George Maguire (1796 in Omagh, Ireland – 1882), was the first foreign-born mayor and  first Democrat to be elected mayor of St. Louis, Missouri (1842–1843)
Death: 	Oct. 22, 1882
Saint Louis
St. Louis City
Missouri, USA

See also

 List of mayors of St. Louis

External links

1796 births
1882 deaths
People from Omagh
Missouri Democrats
19th-century Irish people
Mayors of St. Louis
Irish emigrants to the United States (before 1923)
19th-century American politicians